Alfred Karl Meebold (Heidenheim an der Brenz, Kingdom of Württemberg, September 29, 1863 – January 6, 1952, Havelock North, New Zealand) was a botanist, writer, and anthroposophist.

Life 

Meebold worked at his father's factory, in the  Württembergische Cattunmanufactur factory in Heidenheim an der Brenz, which produced indienne printed cottons that imitated Indian patterns.

He travelled to India three times, first in 1904, and to Australia and New Zealand for the first time in 1928.
Meebold became a personal student of Rudolf Steiner.
Between 1928 and 1938 he spent many months in Budapest, Hungary, where he worked at the first non-German-language Waldorf school in the world. Its founder was Nagy Emilné Göllner Mária (later, in Switzerland known as Maria von Nagy).

Meebold left Europe in 1938, intending to relocate to New Zealand.  He was delayed in Hawaii because of World War II, and was not able to leave Honolulu until after 1945.

Botanical Collecting 

Meebold was a prolific botanical collector. In Australasian herbaria there are over 1539 specimens that he collected, with more than 1,000 specimens held by the National Herbarium of Victoria Royal Botanic Gardens Victoria. Outside of Australasia, his specimens are held by the University of Munich and the Botanische Staatssammlung München. 

The endemic Australian plant genus Meeboldina is named in his honour, as are the species Darwinia meeboldii, Acacia meeboldii, and Geranium meeboldii.

He was also honoured in 1924, when botanist H.Wolff published a genus of flowering plants from Central Asia, belonging to the family Apiaceae as 'Meeboldia.

Works 

 Luzie's Testament, short stories (1895–1898)
 Vox Humana, short stories (1895–1898, Berlin)
 Sarolta, novel (1904, Berlin)
 Das Erwachen der Seele, novel (1907, München)
 Indien (1907, Berlin)
 Der Weg zum Geist, auto-biography (1917 and 1920, München)
 Irrmansdorf, novel (1926–1927, Basel)
 Hotel Mooswald, novel (1928, Basel)
 Der botanische Wandersmann, poems (1931, Oedenburg)
 Zwischen Elf und Engel, poems (1933, Oedenburg)
 Kurs zur Einführung in die Anthroposophie Rudolf Steiners, 6 lectures in Vienna, 1931. (1936)

References

External links
 Meebold biography  at Forschungsstelle Kulturimpuls 

1863 births
1952 deaths
People from Heidenheim
People from the Kingdom of Württemberg
19th-century German botanists
Anthroposophists

German male writers
20th-century German botanists